Hoàng Văn Khánh (born 5 April 1995) is a Vietnamese footballer who plays as a centre-back for V.League 1 club Sông Lam Nghệ An and the Vietnam national football team.

International goals

Vietnam U23

References 

1995 births
Living people
Vietnamese footballers
Association football central defenders
V.League 1 players
Song Lam Nghe An FC players
Can Tho FC players
People from Nghệ An province
Competitors at the 2017 Southeast Asian Games
Southeast Asian Games competitors for Vietnam